The Save-On-Foods Memorial Centre (SOFMC) is an indoor arena located in Victoria, British Columbia, Canada, and is the largest arena in British Columbia outside of Vancouver. It is primarily used for ice hockey, previously the home arena of the Victoria Salmon Kings of the ECHL, and currently the home of the Victoria Royals of the Western Hockey League.

The SOFMC was developed and is operated by RG Properties Ltd., a Vancouver-based development/entertainment company with commercial, recreational and entertainment facilities throughout British Columbia. RG Properties Ltd. was the corporate owner of the former Victoria Salmon Kings hockey team and owns the Victoria Royals.

Features
The arena is primarily used for ice hockey and is also used for concerts and other special events such as figure skating, curling, plays, trade shows and conferences. It is also opened for public ice skating on special occasions; the public skated with the former Victoria Salmon Kings players after some of the games. The building also features a fine dining restaurant (Lion's Den Restaurant), 26 luxury suites, retail and meeting space. Shaw Communications has a television studio on the main floor and Regroove Solutions Inc] (formerly itgroove Professional Services) shares office space with the arena and Victoria Royals personnel. It occupies the site of the former Victoria Memorial Arena as its successor facility. It is located within 10–15 minutes walking distance from the other downtown Victoria landmarks such as: Chinatown, the Bay Centre shopping centre and Market Square.

History
SOFMC was completed in 2005 and has a maximum seating capacity of 7,400. It replaced the aging and outdated Memorial Arena, also known as the "Barn on Blanshard" (rectangular with a curved roof, resembled a barn or aircraft hangar) which had been constructed in 1949. The first event to be held at the new arena was a Rod Stewart concert, one in which Stewart and his performers came out on stage in hardhats and orange safety vests, poking fun at the fact the arena wasn't totally completed at the time.

Notable concerts and events held
The arena has hosted many musical and performance acts, as well as guest speakers, sporting tournaments, trade shows and other events. The following is a partial list of some of the more well-known guests and events to appear during the first two decades of the arena's existence:

Select Your Tickets
Save-On-Foods Memorial Centre has its own in-house ticketing company called "Select Your Tickets", which is also owned by RG Properties Ltd. "Select Your Tickets" has been operating inside the building since it opened in 2005. And is also operated in Kelowna B.C.

References

External links

Indoor arenas in British Columbia
Indoor ice hockey venues in Canada
Sports venues in Victoria, British Columbia
Victoria Royals
Victoria Salmon Kings
Music venues in British Columbia
Sports venues completed in 2005
2005 establishments in British Columbia